Alapati Leiua (born 21 September 1988 in Samoa) is a rugby union footballer who plays as a centre or wing for URC team the Stormers, and internationally for Samoa. He previously played for Wasps & Bristol Bears.

Career
Born and raised in Samoa, Leiua moved to Wellington as a 16 year old to attend Porirua College.

On 29 April 2014, Leiua moved to England as he signed for the Wasps in the Aviva Premiership for the 2014–15 season. It was announced on 30 January 2017 that he would be starting the 2017/18 season with Bristol

References

External links
Hurricanes profile
 

1988 births
Living people
Bristol Bears players
Expatriate rugby union players in England
Hurricanes (rugby union) players
People from Tuamasaga
Rugby union centres
Rugby union wings
Samoa international rugby union players
Samoan emigrants to New Zealand
Samoan expatriate rugby union players
Samoan expatriate sportspeople in England
Samoan rugby union players
Wasps RFC players
Wellington rugby union players
Waikato rugby union players
Stormers players